Beyond the Pale is the second studio album by American singer Fiona. It was originally released in 1986 through Atlantic Records on vinyl and cassette only; a CD edition was reissued in 2004 through Wounded Bird Records, followed by a remaster in 2014 through Rock Candy Records.

Critical reception

In a retrospective review for AllMusic, critic Andrew Hamlin awarded Beyond the Pale 2.5 stars out of 5, describing it as 80s pop, [with] gated drums, and synthesizer stabs punctuated with '80s metal guitar."

Track listing

Personnel
Credits are adapted from the Beyond the Pale liner notes.

Fiona – lead vocals
Bobby Messano – guitar (tracks 1, 9, 10)
Mike Slamer – guitar (tracks 2, 3, 5–9)
Reb Beach – guitar (tracks 2–4, 7, 10)
Nile Rodgers – guitar (track 2)
Beau Hill – keyboards, keyboard bass, drum programming (track 3), percussion (tracks 1, 3, 8), horn programming, horn arrangement, backing vocals (tracks 1, 2, 5, 6, 9), producer
Benjy King – keyboard (track 10)
Joe Franco – drums (tracks 1, 3, 4, 6, 8–10)
David Rosenberg – drums (tracks 2, 5, 7), drum programming (tracks 3, 10), percussion (tracks 3, 8, 10)
Donnie Kisselbach – bass
Harlem Katzenjammer Horns – horns
Kip Winger – backing vocals (tracks 1, 4, 7, 9)
Stephen Benben – backing vocals (track 1), engineering
Louis Merlino – backing vocals (tracks 4–6)
Sandy Stewart – backing vocals (track 7)
Ted Jensen – mastering

References

External links

Fiona (singer) albums
1986 albums
Atlantic Records albums
Wounded Bird Records albums
Albums produced by Beau Hill